The Audacity of Hype is an album released on October 20, 2009 by Jello Biafra and the Guantanamo School of Medicine on Alternative Tentacles. The name is a parody of Barack Obama's book The Audacity of Hope.

Song origins
Some of the songs have previously been played by Biafra with other collaborators:
 "Electronic Plantation", "Panic Land", and "Three Strikes" originated from an unreleased collaboration with Biafra and The Heads.
 "New Feudalism" and "Electronic Plantation" were released by The No WTO Combo on the live album Live from the Battle in Seattle.

Track listing

Personnel
Jello Biafra – Vocals
Ralph Spight – Guitars
Jon Weiss – Drums
Billy Gould –  Bass guitar
Kimo Ball – Guitars

Additional personnel 
Ani Kyd – Back-up vocals on "Electronic Plantation" and "Pets Eat Their Masters" 
Pat Wynne – Back-up vocals
Anne-Marie Anderson – Back up vocals

References

2009 albums
Jello Biafra and the Guantanamo School of Medicine albums
Alternative Tentacles albums